Ajamxanthone is a chemical compound which is produced by the fungus Aspergillus stellatus. Ajamxanthone forms  yellow needles. Its synonyms are (+)-ajamxanthone and CTK8I3902.

References

Further reading 

 
 

Mycotoxins
Xanthones